Biebrich scarlet (C.I. 26905) is a molecule used in Lillie's trichrome.

The dye was created in 1878 by the German chemist Rudolf Nietzki.

Biebrich scarlet dyes are used to color hydrophobic materials like fats and oils. The dye is an illegal dye for food additives because of its carcinogenic properties. Biebrich scarlet can have harmful effects on living and non-living organisms in natural water, therefore the pollutant must be removed. Removal of the pollutant involves absorption, membrane filtration, precipitation, ozonation, fungal detachment, and electrochemical separation. Hydrogel absorbents have active sites to which the dye is held using electrostatic interactions. Photocatalysis allows for almost total degradation of Biebrich scarlet azo dye bonds in less than 10 hours. Degradation of Biebrich scarlet is also observed using lignin peroxidase enzyme from wood rotting fungus in the presence of mediators like 2-chloro-1,4-dimethoxybenzene.

See also
 Masson's trichrome stain

References

Staining
Azo dyes
Acid dyes